A malakoff is a ball of fried cheese typically found in western Switzerland, more specifically in the villages of Eysins, Begnins, Bursins, Luins, and Vinzel (where it is also called “Vinzel beignet”) on the shores of Lake Leman. The name comes from the Battle of Malakoff, the dish itself having been invented by Swiss mercenaries during the siege of Sevastopol.

History

At the time of the Crimean War (1853-1856), English and French troops in whose ranks many Swiss were fighting found themselves immobilized in front of the city of Sebastopol, which was defended in particular by Fort Malakoff. General Aimable Pélissier had zigzag trenches dug to allow an approach to the fort safe from Russian artillery. During the period, legend says the soldiers fried slices of cheese in a pan or simply warmed them around a campfire. However, the daily rations of the soldiers of the Swiss Legion did not include cheese and no written source has confirmed the legend.

After an eleven-month siege, the fort was taken in September 1855 and its capture led to the fall of Sevastopol and the Treaty of Paris on March 30, 1856. According to oral tradition, on returning home, many Swiss from Geneva and the La Côte would occasionally gather to taste slices of cheese fried in a pan in butter, accompanied by bread and many pitchers of white wine. In memory of the assaults on the famous Sebastopol tower, this famous cheese-based dish was named after the fort and called malakoff.

The modern recipe for malakoffs arose from an occasion between 1880 and 1891 when a young couple from Bursins, Jules and Ida Larpin, were in the service of Prince Napoléon-Jérôme Bonaparte at the Prangins villa. Napoleon was hosting a reception attended by veterans of the Crimean War when Mrs. Larpin, always on the lookout for novelty in the culinary arts and at the request of the prince who wanted to honor his guests, served as a starter an adapted version of malakoffs in the form of a slice of cheese coated with pastry, fried and cooked in butter.

Serving
Malakoffs are sometimes served as an hors d'oeuvre. Traditionally, malakoff was served in the form of sticks while Vinzel beignets were more like balls of grated cheese on bread and then fried, but the distinction has become less clear in recent years, with many establishments now serving spherical malakoffs.

See also
 List of cheese dishes
 List of hors d'oeuvre

References

Swiss cuisine
Cheese dishes